A Royal lives clause is a contract clause which provides that a certain right must be exercised within (usually) the lifetime plus 21 years of the last living descendant of a British Monarch who happens to be alive at the time when the contract is made.

Form 
A sample clause would read:

Rationale

The clause became part of contractual drafting in response to common law rule developed by the courts known as the rule against perpetuities.  That rule provided that any future disposition of property must vest within "a life in being plus 21 years".  The rule generally affects two types of transactions: trusts and options to acquire property.  Generally speaking, such transfers must vest before the end of the maximum period, or the grant will be void.  Under the old common law, a transaction would be void even if the property might possibly vest after the end of the maximum period, but now most jurisdictions have, by statute, adopted "wait and see" laws.

In an attempt to mitigate the perceived harshness of the common law rule, and to maximise the possible length of time for which trusts in particular could subsist, lawyers began to draft so-called Royal lives clauses. Royal lives were chosen because (a) it was assumed that being affluent, at least one or two members of the family could be assumed to live a reasonably long period of time, and (b) being Royalty, it would be reasonably easy to calculate the lives of the descendants. In practice, a dead monarch was usually chosen so as to maximise the possibility of a grandchild or great-grandchild who would be outside of the immediate Royal family  having recently been born.

Outside the United Kingdom
In the United States, President's lives clauses are used for similar reasons; well-documented political and industrial families (such as the Kennedys and Rockefellers) are also used.  In the Commonwealth, use of Royal lives tends to persist. In Ireland, the descendants of Éamon de Valera are sometimes used.

See also
 Line of succession to the British Throne

Footnotes

Wills and trusts
Contract clauses